Proceroblesthis prolata is a species of beetle in the family Cerambycidae, and the only species in the genus Proceroblesthis. It was described by Galileo and Martins in 1987.

References

Forsteriini
Beetles described in 1987